Anthony Vincent (1939–1999) was the Canadian ambassador to Peru. He was a key player in the Japanese embassy hostage crisis of 1996, in Peru. He later served as ambassador to Spain. He is the subject of the 2008 book The Ambassador's Word: Hostage Crisis in Peru 1996-97 by David J. Goldfield. Vincent died in 1999 at the age of 59. On the day of his death, Prime Minister of Canada Jean Chrétien gave a eulogy.

References

1939 births
1999 deaths
Ambassadors of Canada to Peru
Ambassadors of Canada to Spain
Place of birth missing
Place of death missing